The Madonna of the Animals is a drawing on card by the artist Albrecht Dürer, from c. 1503. It measures 32 by 24 cm. Some areas of the drawing also feature watercolour. It is now held in the prints and drawings collection of the Albertina in Vienna.

Bibliography
Costantino Porcu (ed), Dürer, Rizzoli, Milano 2004.

1500s works
Drawings by Albrecht Dürer
Watercolours by Albrecht Dürer
Dogs in art
Birds in art
Paintings of the Madonna and Child
Collections of the Albertina, Vienna